Tipton Township may refer to the following townships in the United States:

 Tipton Township, Cass County, Indiana
 Tipton Township, Hardin County, Iowa